The Revo is a semi-automatic belay device manufactured under the brand Wild Country by manufacturer Oberalp, for sports climbing with single ropes. It appeared on the market in autumn 2018. 

The Revo combines the easy and dynamic handling of a tuber with the backup by a centrifugal brake. Paying out and taking in rope works fluently without resistance. Only when the rope rushes with a faster speed than 4 metre/second through the device, it arrests within a few centimetres. 

According to European Norm EN15151-1, the Revo is a "Braking devices with manually assisted locking" (Type 8: "Belaying and abseiling with a panic locking element"). 

It is suitable for belaying with a dynamic single rope (Ø 8,5–11 mm), for left-handed and right-handed persons equally. Abseiling is possible on a single strand with some restrictions. 

The device weighs 283 g (the Grigri 2, in comparison, 170 g).

References 

Climbing equipment